The 2021 Supercar Challenge powered by Hankook was the twenty-first Supercar Challenge season since it replaced the Supercar Cup in 2001. It began at Circuit Zandvoort 10 April and ended at TT Circuit Assen on 31 October.

Calendar

Entry list

Race results
Bold indicates overall winner.

Championship standings

Notes

References

External links

Supercar Challenge
Supercar Challenge
Supercar Challenge